Vandar (also Romanized as Vanehdar, Vendar, and Winadar; also known as Vamdar Koohpayeh) is a village in Kuhpayeh-e Sharqi Rural District, in the Central District of Abyek County, Qazvin Province, Iran. At the 2006 census, its population was 87, in 30 families.

References 

Populated places in Abyek County